Buddy's Blues is a novel by British author Nigel Hinton which was first published in 1995. It is the third and final installment in the Buddy trilogy, after Buddy and Buddy's Song, and follows the rest of Buddy's life from the age of 18 including his musical career.

Concept
At the swimming pool the author once saw an old man trying to teach his granddaughter how to swim. This made Hinton wonder if Terry would have done a better job looking after a grandchild than Buddy. Also the film version of Buddy's Song had just been released and a song from the film went on to top the charts so the author combined the two to write Buddy's Blues.

Award
In 1996 the novel won the Stockport Schools' Book Award.

References

1995 British novels
Viking Press books